Peter Richman (fl. 1407) was an English Member of Parliament for Lyme Regis in 1407.

References

14th-century births
15th-century deaths
English MPs 1407
Members of the Parliament of England (pre-1707) for Lyme Regis